The Tuomy Hills Service Station is a commercial building located 2460 Washtenaw Avenue in Ann Arbor, Michigan. It was listed on the National Register of Historic Places in 2000.

History
Cornelius ("Bill") and Kathryn Tuomy were siblings from a family with deep roots in the Ann Arbor area.  The pair were in the real estate business, and were responsible for the development of the Tuomy Hills area of Ann Arbor.  In 1928, when Stadium Boulevard was first constructed, the Tuomys decided that the area where Stadium crossed Washtenaw needed a gas station.  They hired Ann Arbor architects Lynn Fry and Paul Kasurin to design this service station, though other sources list the architect as Frank Carson (winner of the 1925 Prix de Rome). The Standard Oil Company leased the station, and exhibited a replica it at the 1933 World's Fair in Chicago.

When Bill Tuomy died in 1966, Standard Oil bought the station, and ran it until 1988 when it was boarded up. In 1999, the station was refurbished for use as a University Bank ATM branch. In 2005, Bearclaw Coffee Co. moved into the station, and remains there as of 2021.

Description
The Tuomy Hills Service Station is a single story commercial building, constructed in a style variously described as reflecting an Irish gatehouse or English gatekeeper's cottage. The walls consists of eight inches of brick faced with eight inches of stone. The station sits on a heavy concrete pad, and is roofed with slate. The structure has two porte-cochères, each supported with hand-hewn oak pillars.

References

Commercial buildings on the National Register of Historic Places in Michigan
Tudor Revival architecture in Michigan
Buildings and structures completed in 1928
Buildings and structures in Ann Arbor, Michigan
National Register of Historic Places in Washtenaw County, Michigan